Austrian nationalism is the nationalism that asserts that Austrians are a nation and promotes the cultural unity of Austrians. Austrian nationalism originally developed as a cultural nationalism that emphasized a Catholic religious identity. This in turn led to its opposition to unification with Protestant-majority Prussia, something that was perceived as a potential threat to the Catholic core of Austrian national identity. It was also used to protect the rule of the Habsburgs.

Austrian nationalism first arose during the Napoleonic Wars, with Joseph von Hormayr as a prominent Austrian nationalist political leader at the time. In the 1930s the Fatherland Front government of Engelbert Dollfuss and Kurt Schuschnigg rejected current pan-German aspirations to join Austria with a Protestant-dominated Germany, whilst not wholly rejecting a potential union and claiming that any unification of Austria with Germany would require a federal German state where Austria and Austrians were guaranteed privileged status recognizing an Austrian nation within a German Kulturnation.  Following the events of World War II and Nazism, Austrians began to reject the German identity, and a broader Austrian identity replaced it. After the war, Austrians went as far as describing themselves as "Hitler's first victim". 

In the post-World War II period proponents who recognize an Austrian nation have rejected a German identity of Austrians and have emphasized the non-German heritage among the Austrian population including Celtic, Illyrian, Roman, and Slavic. Proponents who recognize Austrians as a nation claim that Austrians have Celtic heritage, as Austria is the location of the first characteristically Celtic culture (Halstatt culture) to exist. Contemporary Austrians express pride in having Celtic heritage and Austria possesses one of the largest collections of Celtic artifacts in Europe. In addition to German, the State of Austria also recognizes three minority languages ​​in the country.

Austrian nationalism has been challenged internally. The main rival nationalism has been German nationalism. Another rival nationalism emerged after the defeat of Austria-Hungary in World War I, Bavarian nationalism which challenged the new Austrian Republic with proposals for Austria to join Bavaria. At this time the Bavarian government held particular interest in incorporating the regions of North Tyrol and Upper Austria into Bavaria. This was a serious issue in the aftermath of World War I with significant numbers of Austria's North Tyrolese declaring their intention to have North Tyrol join Bavaria.

History

The Napoleonic Wars were the cause of the final dissolution of the Holy Roman Empire of the German nation, and ultimately the cause for the quest for a German nation state in 19th-century German nationalism.

German nationalism began to rise rapidly within the German Confederation, in 1866 the feud between the two most powerful German states Austria and Prussia finally came to a head in the German war in 1866. The Austrians favoured the Greater Germany unification but were not willing to give up any of the non-German-speaking land inside of the Austrian Empire and take second place to Prussia. The Prussians however wanted to unify Germany as Little Germany primarily by the Kingdom of Prussia, whilst excluding Austria. In the final battle of the German war (Battle of Königgrätz) the Prussians successfully defeated the Austrians and succeeded in creating the North German Confederation. In 1871, Germany was unified as a nation-state as the German Empire that was Prussian-led and without Austria. Nevertheless, the integration of the Austrians remained a strong desire for many people of both Austria and Germany, especially among the liberals, the social democrats and also the Catholics who were a minority within the Protestant Germany.

The idea of uniting all ethnic Germans into one state began to be challenged with the rise of Austrian nationalism within the Christian Social Party that identified Austrians on the basis of their predominantly Catholic religious identity as opposed to the predominantly Protestant religious identity of the Prussians. More than 90% of interbellum Austrians identified as Catholic. Following the end of World War I in the rump state of German-Austria, many Austrians desired to be united with Germany. However, less than 50 % of Austrians desired unification with Germany in the 1920s, and this sentiment further declined with the fall of the pan-Germanist Social Democrat government under Karl Renner.

With the rise of Engelbert Dollfuss to power in Austria in 1932 and the creation of the Fatherland's Front, the Dolfuss government promoted Austrian nationalism and claimed that Catholic Austria would not accept joining a Protestant Germany or "heathen" Nazi-led Germany. Dollfuss accepted that Austrians were Germans but rejected the idea of Catholic Austrians submitting themselves to be taken over by a Protestant-dominated Germany, and instead claimed that Austria needed to revive itself and recognize the greatness of its history such as its Habsburg dynasty having been the leading part of the German Holy Roman Empire, and that when Austria restored itself, it would found a federal state of Germany that would recognize Germany as a Kulturnation, but would also recognize Austria as having a privileged place within such a federal state and the existence of an Austrian nation within the German Kulturnation.

The Dollfuss/Schnuschnigg government did not deny that Austrians were Germans but opposed annexation into Germany especially under the Nazi regime. According to the estimates of the Austrian government, with the voting age of 24, about 70% of Austrians would have voted to preserve the Austrian independence. After the Wehrmacht troops entered Austria to enforce the Anschluss, the Nazis held a controlled plebiscite (Volksabstimmung) in the whole Reich within the following month, asking the people to ratify the fait accompli, and claimed that 99.75% of the votes cast in Austria were in favor. In case of a fair plebiscite, the Anschluss would have been supported only by 20 % of the Austrian population. The relationship between Austrian Catholicism, national identity, and fascism has been a source of controversy. After the fall of Nazi Germany and the events from this and World War II, Austrians began to develop a more distinct national identity. Unlike earlier in the 20th century, in 1987 only 6 percent of the Austrians identified themselves as "Germans". In 2008, over 90 percent of the Austrians saw themselves as an independent nation.

Nationalist parties
 Fatherland Front (Austria)
 Freedom Party of Austria

Personalities 
Engelbert Dollfuss
Ernst Rüdiger Starhemberg
Kurt Schuschnigg

See also
 German nationalism
 Austria-Hungary
 Austrian Empire
 Austrians
 Halstatt culture
 Holy Roman Empire
 Similar cases such as
 Montenegrin nationalism
 Taiwanese nationalism
 Related nationalisms and patriotisms
 Austro-Hungarian Empire
 Bavarian nationalism
 Bosniak nationalism
 Croatian nationalism
 Czech nationalism
 Czechoslovakism
 German nationalism
 German nationalism in Austria
 Hungarian nationalism
 Italian nationalism
 Serbian nationalism
 Slovenian nationalism
 Yugoslavism

References

Notes

Bibliography

 
Nationalism